Boechera patens, commonly called spreading rockcress, is a species of flowering plant in the mustard family (Brassicaceae). It is a short-lived biennial forb native to North America. Its natural habitat is xeric soil, often on calcareous substrates. It produces white flowers in the spring.

This species was included in the genus Arabis, but based on recent genetic and cytological data it has been moved to the genus Boechera.

Distribution and habitat
Boechera patens is found in the United States in the states of Alabama, Tennessee, North Carolina, Virginia, West Virginia, Kentucky, Indiana, Ohio, and Pennsylvania. It grows in rocky wooded slopes, limestone bluffs, and along shady stream banks.

References

patens
Flora of North America